Guihulngan, officially the City of Guihulngan, is a 5th class component city in the province of Negros Oriental, Philippines. According to the 2020 census, it has a population of 102,656 people, the third-most populous city in Negros Oriental after the cities of Dumaguete and Bayawan. Guihulngan is also dubbed by its residents as the "rising city of the north".

History
There are several versions of how the city derived its name. The first, according to old tales, was attributed to a river flowing directly to the town proper from the mainspring in sitio Anahaw, Barangay Nagsaha, hence the name "GUIPADULNGAN" which means the point where the river flows to an end.

Some of the towns of early creation were founded at the close of the 18th century and the beginning of the 19th century. Dauin, for example, was founded in 1787, Tayasan, in 1790; Jimalalud, in 1797; Guijulñgan, in 1800; and Bacong, in 1801.

As constituted in 1898, it included the following towns: Amblan, Ayungon, Ayuquitan, Bacong, Bais, Bayanan, Canoan, Dauin, Dumaguete  (capital), Guijulñgan, Manjuyod, Nueva Valencia, Siaton, Tanjay, Tayasan, Tolon, and Zamboanguita.

The second is associated with the gruesome incident in the 19th Century when the Philippines was a colony of Spain; men and women of different ages were said to be captured, beheaded and thrown into the sea by the Moros, now known as Tañon Strait. Other accounts claim that the Moro invaders dropped a bell into the sea when they found out that it was used by the lookout to warn the townsfolk of their coming. Since that time, the place has been called "GUIHULUGAN" which means, "Place where a thing was dropped". But in the Spanish writing, "U" and "N" are similar, which is why it became commonly written and known as GUIHULNGAN.

Whether it originated as "GUIPADULNGAN" or "GUIHULNGAN", the name is indeed symbolic, as the town is “dropped” with abundant blessings from the Almighty for a significant "end".

In 17th century map Murillo-Velarde Map it somewhat appears as "Dijolongan".

Cityhood

On July 14, 2007, Guihulngan becomes a city in the province of Negros Oriental through ratification of Republic Act 9409 which was approved last March 24.

The Supreme Court declared the cityhood law of Guihulngan and 15 other cities unconstitutional after a petition filed by the League of Cities of the Philippines in its ruling on November 18, 2008. On December 22, 2009, the cityhood law of Guihulngan and 15 other municipalities regain its status as cities again after the court reversed its ruling on November 18, 2008. On August 23, 2010, the court reinstated its ruling on November 18, 2008, causing Guihulngan and 15 cities to become regular municipalities. Finally, on February 15, 2011, Guihulngan becomes a city again including the 15 municipalities declaring that the conversion to cityhood met all legal requirements.

After six years of legal battle, in its board resolution, the League of Cities of the Philippines acknowledged and recognized the cityhood of Guihulngan and 15 other cities.

Geography
Guihulngan is located in the northern part of the province on the coast of Tañon Strait.

Barangays
Guihulngan is politically subdivided into 33 barangays.

Climate

Demographics

Economy

Tourism

Landmarks
A huge bell with a Carabao was served as the main attraction of the city located at the side of Justice Hall along the National Highway.

Festival
Cara-Bell Festival (Every May 24) – Legend has it that marauding pirates used to slaughter natives of the town and drop their corpses into the sea. Guihulugan Festival of Guihulngan is usually celebrated on May 24. This festival is also referred to as the Cara-Bell Festival because of a story about a bell that saved the lives of the natives. According to some legends of the olden days, Moro pirates sailed the lands of Negros Oriental.

Transportation
Mactan–Cebu International Airport is the closest major airport to Guihulngan, although it is located in Cebu. Fast ferries connect Guihulngan to Cebu via Tangil Port in Dumanjug. Buses also connect Guihulngan to nearby San Carlos City.

Education
Negros Oriental State University, the only state university in the province of Negros Oriental has a satellite campus in the city. It is known as the Guihulngan City Campus.

Saint Francis College – Guihulngan (SFC-G) is a private institution located in Bateria, Guihulngan, Negros Oriental. Inspired by the Charism of Saint Francis of Asissi, it was founded by three Franciscan friars.

References

External links 

 [ Philippine Standard Geographic Code]
 Philippine Census Information
 Local Governance Performance Management System 
 

Cities in Negros Oriental
Component cities in the Philippines